Bruno Wartelle (born 26 August 1971) is a French boxer.

Life and career 
Wartelle was born in Algiers. He was the brother of Philippe Wartelle, an Olympic boxer.

Wartelle competed at the 1991 and 1993 Mediterranean Games, winning the silver and bronze medal in the lightweight event. He also competed at the 1995 World Amateur Boxing Championships, winning the silver medal in the lightweight (-60 kilograms) event.

References

External links 

1971 births
Living people
Sportspeople from Algiers
French male boxers
Lightweight boxers
AIBA World Boxing Championships medalists
Competitors at the 1991 Mediterranean Games
Competitors at the 1993 Mediterranean Games
Mediterranean Games medalists in boxing
Mediterranean Games silver medalists for France
Mediterranean Games bronze medalists for France